Flexor digiti minimi brevis may refer to:
 Flexor digiti minimi brevis (hand)
 Flexor digiti minimi brevis muscle (foot)